This is a list of schools in Merthyr Tydfil in Wales.

English-medium primary schools

Abercanaid Community School
Bedlinog Community Primary School
Brecon Road Infants School
Caedraw Primary School
Cyfarthfa Junior School
Dowlais Primary School
Edwardsville Primary School
Gellifaelog Primary School
Goetre Primary School
Gwaunfarren Primary School
Heolgerrig Community School
Pantysgallog Primary School
St Aloysius RC Primary School
St Illtyd’s RC Primary School
St Mary's RC Primary School
Trelewis Primary School
Troedyhriw Primary School
Twynyrodyn Community School
Ynysowen Community Primary School
Ysgol y Graig Primary
Ysgol Gynradd Coed y Dderwen

Welsh-medium primary schools

Ysgol Gynradd Gymraeg Rhyd-y-Grug
Ysgol Gynradd Gymraeg Santes Tudful

English-medium secondary schools
Afon Tâf High School
Bishop Hedley High School
Cyfarthfa High School
Pen y Dre High School

, there is no Welsh-medium secondary school in the borough. Many Welsh-speaking pupils attend Ysgol Gyfun Rhydywaun near Aberdare in Rhondda Cynon Taf.

Special school
Greenfield Special School

References

 
Merthyr Tydfil